Todd M. Lakey is an American attorney and politician. A Republican, he has represented district 12 in the Idaho Senate since 2013. He currently serves as chair of the Senate Judiciary and Rules Committee.

Early life and education
Lakey was born in Portland, Oregon. He earned a Bachelor of Science degree in international business from Brigham Young University and a Juris Doctor from Lewis & Clark Law School.

Career
When Idaho Attorney General Alan G. Lance Sr. announced he would not run again, Lakey was one of four Republicans who ran in the May 28, 2002 primary election; he came in 3rd with 29,154 votes (23.5%), losing to Lawrence Wasden, who won the general election.

As a member of the Idaho Senate, Lakey was one of several main sponsors of SB 1385, a trigger law that would criminalize most abortions if Roe v. Wade was overturned. The bill was passed in March 2020.

Elections

References

External links
Todd M. Lakey at the Idaho Legislature
Official campaign site
 

Year of birth missing (living people)
Living people
Brigham Young University alumni
Idaho lawyers
Republican Party Idaho state senators
Lewis & Clark Law School alumni
People from Nampa, Idaho
Politicians from Portland, Oregon
United States Army officers
21st-century American politicians